Space Delta 7 (DEL 7) is a United States Space Force unit responsible for Intelligence, Surveillance and Reconnaissance (ISR) for the United States Space Force. The delta provides actionable and time-sensitive intelligence for space domain operations including detection, characterization and targeting of adversary space capabilities. The unit employs a variety of fixed and mobile sensors across the globe operated by intelligence professionals to enable its mission to gain and maintain information dominance in the space domain in the execution of National Defense Strategy priorities.  It is headquartered at Peterson Space Force Base.

History 
Delta 7 was activated on 24 July 2020 with the redesignation of the United States Air Force's 544th Intelligence, Surveillance and Reconnaissance Group. On 3 September 2020, the delta activated the 73rd Intelligence, Surveillance, and Reconnaissance Squadron after the inactivation of the 18th Intelligence Squadron. It gained two additional squadrons on 11 September 2020 with the activation of the 71st Intelligence, Surveillance, and Reconnaissance Squadron and 72nd Intelligence, Surveillance, and Reconnaissance Squadron.

On 8 January 2021, Director of National Intelligence John Ratcliffe designated the "Space Force Intelligence, Surveillance, and Reconnaissance enterprise" the 18th member of the United States Intelligence Community.

Emblem symbolism 
Space Delta 7's emblem consists of the following elements:
The midnight blue and black in the Space Delta 7 emblem signifies the orbital, airborne, and terrestrial aspects of all-domain intelligence, surveillance, and reconnaissance and its mission to fix U.S. adversaries no matter where they operate.
The number 7 represents the Space Force Intelligence, Surveillance, and Reconnaissance professionals that executes its mission.
The seven stars of the constellation Ursa Major represent the core of the Space Intelligence, Surveillance, and Reconnaissance Delta.
The charging bear represents unyielding tenacity to detect and deter the United States' greatest competitors' actions in the space domain.
The key represents unlocking the adversary's secrets to provide actionable intelligence to the warfighter.
The delta is soaring in the direction of Polaris and provides a clear vector to true North.
Platinum represents the foundation and structure Space Operations Command provides to Space Delta 7.

Structure 
Space Delta 7 is composed of the three following squadrons. It also plans to add three new squadrons: a threat analysis squadron; a targeting squadron; and a processing, exploitation, and dissemination squadron.

Commander

See also 

 National Air and Space Intelligence Center
 United States Space Force
 Space Force Intelligence Activity

References 

Deltas of the United States Space Force
United States intelligence agencies
Military units and formations established in 2020